Events from the year 1772 in Austria

Incumbents
 Monarch – Maria Theresa
 Monarch – Joseph II

Events

 
 

 February 17 – The first partition of the Poland is agreed to by the Russian Empire and Prussia, later joined by Austria.

Births

Deaths

References

 
Years of the 18th century in Austria